Roman Kroitor (December 12, 1926 – September 17, 2012) was a Canadian filmmaker who was known as a pioneer of Cinéma vérité, as the co-founder of IMAX, and as the creator of the Sandde hand-drawn stereoscopic 3D animation system. He was also the original inspiration for The Force. His prodigious output garnered numerous awards, including two BAFTA Awards, three Cannes Film Festival awards, and two Oscar nominations.

Early life
Roman Boghdan Kroitor was born in Yorkton, Saskatchewan, to Ukrainian immigrants Peter and Tatiana (Shewchuk), both of whom were teachers. Peter died when Roman was four; Tatiana moved the family to Winnipeg and continued teaching. Roman attended the University of Manitoba, graduating in 1951 with a Master of Arts in Philosophy.

National Film Board of Canada
In 1949 and 1950, Kroitor attended the Summer Intern program at the National Film Board of Canada (NFB) in Ottawa. Upon graduation from university, he was hired full-time, working as a production assistant and later as a film editor. His first film, 1953's Rescue Party laid the foundation for his pioneering Cinéma vérité style, and he went on to produce influential films such as Lonely Boy, Glenn Gould: On the Record, Glenn Gould: Off the Record, and the concert film Stravinsky. By 1958, Kroiter was producing documentaries; by 1964, he was one of the producers leading the NFB into the production of fiction films.

IMAX
After seeing the ground-breaking NFB documentary Universe (1960), Stanley Kubrick tried to recruit Kroiter and Colin Low to work on 2001: A Space Odyssey. They declined because, with Hugh O'Connor and Tom Daily, they were working on a large-scale multi-screen film. This was Labyrinth, which the NFB exhibited at Expo 67 in Montreal. The film caused a sensation and, in the same year Kroitor and his friend and colleague, the director Graeme Ferguson, left the NFB as employees, but physically stayed, founding Multi-Screen Corporation (later IMAX Corp.) in the NFB's Montreal studios (with two other friends, Robert Kerr and engineer Bill Shaw). The Multi-Screen process involved a purpose-built camera, and 70mm film projected horizontally rather than vertically, with each frame the size of a postcard.

In 1970, for Expo 70 in Osaka, Kroitor produced the first IMAX film, the 17-minute Tiger Child, directed by Donald Brittain. In 1973, he returned to the NFB as a producer in charge of the Drama department, but continued to make IMAX films until his retirement. In 1990, he co-directed the first IMAX feature film, Stones at the Max. He also produced the first IMAX stereoscopic (S3D) film, We Are Born of Stars (anaglyph, 1985), and co-produced the first full-color OMNIMAX (IMAX Dome) S3D film, Echoes of the Sun (alternate-eye, 1990).

SANDDE
While working to create traditional (actuality) and early CG films in a stereoscopic format, Kroitor became frustrated with the lack of direct interaction between the desires of (right-brained) artists and the results on film, because everything had to pass through the (left-brained) mathematicians and programmers. He conceived of the SANDDE hardware and software system as a way to allow artists to directly draw, in full stereoscopic 3D, what they want the audience to see.

George Lucas and The Force
Kroitor was credited by Star Wars creator George Lucas, as being the origin of the concept of The Force, an important thematic element in the Star Wars films. As reported by The Globe and Mail, Lucas first heard about "the force" in a conversation between Kroitor and Warren Sturgis McCulloch, an artificial intelligence guru, in 21-87, a 1963 collage film made by the NFB's Arthur Lipsett. Disagreeing with McCulloch's assertion that humans are nothing more than highly complex machines, Kroitor argued,: "Many people feel that in the contemplation of nature and in communication with other living things, they become aware of some kind of force, or something, behind this apparent mask which we see in front of us, and they call it God."

Personal life and death
In 1955, Kroitor married (Graeme Ferguson's sister) Janet Ferguson; they had five children and lived in Montreal. On September 17, 2012, he died of a heart attack in his sleep at the age of 85.

Filmography
National Film Board of Canada

 Age of the Beaver - documentary short, Colin Low 1952 - editor
 Rescue Party - documentary short 1953 - director 
 Paul Tomkowinkz: Street-Railway Switchman - documentary short 1953 - co-writer with Stanley Jackson, co-editor and co-producer with Tom Daly, director 
 Farm Calendar - documentary 1955 - writer, director
 To Serve the Mind - documentary short, Stanley Jackson 1955 - co-writer with Stanley Jackson
 Introducing Canada - documentary short, Tom Daly 1956 - co-editor with Tom Daly
 City of Gold - documentary short, Colin Low & Wolf Koenig 1957 - writer 
 The Great Plains - documentary short 1957 - editor, director
 It's a Crime - animated film, Wolf Koenig 1957 - writer 
 L'année à la ferme – documentary short 1957 – writer, director
 Blood and Fire - documentary, Terence Macartney-Filgate 1958 - co-producer with Wolf Koenig 
 Country Threshing - documentary short, Wolf Koenig 1958 - co-producer with Wolf Koenig 
 The Days Before Christmas - documentary short, Wolf Koenig, Stanley Jackson & Terence Macartney-Filgate 1958 - co-editor with René Laporte & Wolf Koenig, co-producer with Wolf Koenig 
 A Foreign Language - documentary short, Stanley Jackson 1958 - co-producer with Wolf Koenig 
 Memory of Summer - documentary short, Stanley Jackson 1958 - co-producer with Wolf Koenig
 Pilgrimage - documentary short, Terence Macartney-Filgate 1958 - co-producer with Wolf Koenig 
 Police - documentary short, Terence Macartney-Filgate 1958 - co-producer with Wolf Koenig 
 The Back-Breaking Leaf - documentary short, Terence Macartney-Filgate 1959 - co-producer with Wolf Koenig
 La Battaison - documentary short, Wolf Koenig 1959 - co-producer with Wolf Koenig 
 The Canadians - documentary short, Tom Daly 1959 - executive producer 
 Emergency Ward - documentary short, William Greaves 1959 - co-producer with Wolf Koenig 
 End of the Line - documentary short, Terence Macartney-Filgate 1959 - co-producer with Wolf Koenig
 Glenn Gould - Off the Record - documentary short 1959 - co-director and co-producer with Wolf Koenig 
 Glenn Gould - On the Record - documentary short 1959 - co-director and co-producer with Wolf Koenig 
 The Cars in Your Life - documentary short Terence Macartney-Filgate 1960 - co-producer with Wolf Koenig
 I Was a Ninety-pound Weakling - documentary short, Wolf Koenig & Georges Dufaux 1960 - co-producer with Wolf Koenig
 Universe - documentary short 1960 - writer, co-director with Colin Low
 The Days of Whiskey Gap - documentary short, Colin Low 1961 - co-producer with Wolf Koenig
 Festival in Puerto Rico - documentary short 1961 - co-director and co-editor with Wolf Koenig, producer
 University - documentary, Stanley Jackson 1961 - co-producer with Wolf Koenig
 Lonely Boy - documentary short 1962 - producer, co-director with Wolf Koenig
 The Living Machine - documentary 1962 - co-producer with Tom Daly, director 
 Toronto Jazz - documentary short, Don Owen 1963 - producer 
 Above the Horizon - documentary short 1964 - co-director with Hugh O'Connor,  co-producer with Hugh O'Connor & Tom Daly 
 The Hutterites - documentary short, Colin Low 1964 - co-producer with Tom Daly
 Legault’s Place - documentary short, Suzanne Angel 1964 - co-producer with Tom Daly 
 Nobody Waved Goodbye - feature, Don Owen 1964 - co-producer with Don Owen 
 The Baymen, documentary short, Rex Tasker 1965 - co-producer with Peter Jones 
 Two Men of Montreal - documentary, Suzanne Angel, Donald Brittain & Don Owen 1965 - co-producer with Donald Brittain, John Kemeny & Tom Daly
 Little White Crimes - short film, George Kaczender 1966 - co-producer with John Kemeny
 Stravinsky - documentary 1966 - producer, co-director with Wolf Koenig
 In the Labyrinth - short film 1967 - co-director with Colin Low, Hugh O'Connor, co-producer with Tom Daly
 Tiger Child - short film, IMAX, Donald Brittain 1970 – writer, co-producer with Ichi Ichikawa
 Circus World, 1974 – director, producer, co-editor with Jackie Newell 
 Propaganda Message - animated short, Barrie Nelson 1974 - co-producer with Wolf Koenig 
 Man the Hunter: Caribou - documentary short, Dennis Sawyer 1974 - executive producer
 Man the Hunter: Fishing - documentary short, Dennis Sawyer 1975 - executive producer
 Man the Hunter: Seal Hunting - documentary short, Dennis Sawyer 1975 - executive producer
 Bargain Basement - short film, John N. Smith 1976 - producer
 For Gentlemen Only - documentary short, Michael J.F. Scott 1976 - executive producer
 Listen Listen Listen - documentary, Barbara Greene 1976 - executive producer 
 Schefferville 4th Arctic Winter Games - documentary short, Dennis Sawyer 1976 - co-producer with Dennis Sawyer 
 Striker - short film, Robert Nichol 1976 - executive producer 
 The World is Round - documentary, Ian McLaren 1976 - executive producer
 The Machine Age - short film, Gilles Carle 1977 - co-producer with Jacques Bobet 
 Back Alley Blue - documentary short, Bill Reid 1977 - executive producer
 Bekevar Jubilee - documentary short, Albert Kish 1977 - executive producer
 Breakdown - short film, Peter Thurling 1977 - executive producer
 Flora: Scenes from a Leadership Convention - documentary, Peter Raymont 1977 - co-executive producer with Arthur Hammond 
 Happiness Is Loving Your Teacher - short film, John N. Smith 1977 - executive producer 
 Henry Ford's America - documentary, Donald Brittain 1977 - co- producer with Donald Brittain & Paul Wright 
 Hold the Ketchup - documentary short, Albert Kish 1977 - executive producer 
 I Wasn’t Scared - short film, Giles Walker 1977 - co-producer with Vladimir Valenta 
 Nature’s Food Chain - documentary short, Bernard Devlin 1977 - executive producer 
 One Man - feature, Robin Spry 1977 - co-producer with Michael J.F. Scott, James de B. Domville, Tom Daly & Vladimir Valenta
 Sail Away - documentary short, Bruce Mackay 1977 - executive producer 
 Strangers at the Door - short film, John Howe 1977 - co-producer with John Howe & Maxine Samuels 
 Oh Canada - animated short, Barrie Nelson 1978 - co-producer with Wolf Koenig, Robert Verrall & Dorothy Courtois
 Easter Eggs - documentary short, Yurij Luhovy 1978 - executive producer 
 Margaret Laurence, First Lady of Manawaka - documentary, Robert Duncan 1978 - executive producer 
 The Point - documentary, Robert Duncan 1978 - executive producer
 The Red Dress - documentary short, Michael J.F. Scott 1978 - co-executive producer with Dieter Nachtigall 
 The Russels - short film, Susan Huycke, Kenneth McCready, Mort Ransen & Bill Reid 1978 - executive producer 
 So Long to Run - short film, Charles Lapp 1978 - executive producer
 Teach Me to Dance - short film, Anne Wheeler 1978 - co-producer with Vladimir Valenta & John Howe 
 Voice of the Fugitive - short film, René Bonnière 1978 - executive producer 
 The War is Over - short film, René Bonnière 1978 - executive producer
 Bravery in the Field - short film, Giles Walker 1979 - executive producer, co-producer with Stefan Wodoslawsky 
 Gopher Broke - short film, Peter Thurling 1979 - executive producer, co-producer with Stefan Wodoslawsky 
 Love on Wheels - short film, Ben Low & Ian Rankin 1979 - executive producer
 Northern Composition - documentary short, Bruce Mackay & Gary Toole 1979 - executive producer
 Revolution's Orphans - documentary short, John N. Smith 1979 - co-producer with Rob Iveson 
 Twice Upon a Time - short film, Giles Walker 1979 - co-producer with Stefan Wodoslawsky
 Why Men Rape - documentary, Douglas Jackson 1979 - executive producer 
 Acting Class - documentary short, John N. Smith 1980 - executive producer
 Challenger: An Industrial Romance - Stephen Low 1980 - executive producer 
 Coming Back Alive - documentary short, Wolf Koenig, Paul Cowan, Rosemarie Shapley & Bill Mason 1980 - co-producer with Wolf Koenig 
 Maritimes Dig - documentary short, Dennis Sawyer 1980 - executive producer 
 Prehistoric Artifacts, New Brunswick - documentary short, Dennis Sawyer 1980 - executive producer
 Nose and Tina - documentary short, Norma Bailey 1980 - executive producer
 This was the Beginning, Part 1: The Invertebrates - documentary short, Dennis Sawyer 1980 - executive producer 
 This was the Beginning, Part 2: The Vertebrates - documentary short, Dennis Sawyer 1980 - executive producer 
 Baxter Earns His Wings - short film, Don Arioli 1981 - executive producer
 First Winter - documentary short, John N. Smith 1981 - executive producer
 Arthritis: A Dialogue with Pain - documentary, Susan Huycke 1981 - co-executive producer with Robert Verrall 
 Hail Columbia - IMAX documentary, Graeme Ferguson 1981 - co-producer with Graeme Ferguson
 Where the Buoys Are - documentary short, Wolf Koenig, Paul Cowan, Rosemarie Shapley, Bill Mason 1981 - co-producer with Wolf Koenig 
 Laughter in My Soul - documentary short, Halya Kuchmij 1983 - co-executive producer with Robert Verrall
 Skyward - short film, IMAX, Stephen Low 1985 - co-producer with Susumu Sakane
 Starbreaker - short film, Bruce Mackay 1984 - co-editor with Bruce Mackay, producer, co-executive producer with Robert Verrall
 A Freedom to Move - documentary short, IMAX, Michel Brault 1985 - executive producer
 We Are Born of Stars - documentary short, IMAX 3D, Nelson Max 1985 - producer, writer Heart Land - documentary short, IMAX, Norma Bailey, Richard Condie, Aaron Kim Johnston, Derek Mazur, John Paskievich, Gail Singer & Brion Whitford 1987 - co-producer with Sally Dundas
 Echoes of the Sun - documentary short, IMAX 1990 - co-director with Nelson Max, co-writer with Nelson Max & Colin Low, co-producer with Fumio Sumi & Sally Dundas
 Flowers in the Sky, IMAX, 1990 - co-producer with Charles Konowal
 The Last Buffalo - documentary short, IMAX 3D, Stephen Low 1990 - co-producer with Sally Dundas
 Imagine - documentary short, IMAX 3D, John Weiley 1993 - co-producer with Hyok-Kyu Kwon
 Stones at the Max - concert film, IMAX, Julien Temple,  David Douglas, Noel Archambault, Christine Strande 1994 - co-director
 Paint Misbehavin’ - animated short, IMAX 3D, Peter Stephenson 1996 - co-producer with Steve Hoban 
 CyberWorld - animated film, IMAX 3D, Colin Davies & Elaine Despins 2000 - co-producer with Sally Dundas, Steve Hoban & Hugh Murray

AwardsPaul Tomkowicz: Street-Railway Switchman (1953) 
 International Short Film Festival Oberhausen, Oberhausen: First Prize, 1958
 Edinburgh International Film Festival, Edinburgh: Diploma of Merit, Cultural, 1958
 International Filmfestival Mannheim-Heidelberg, Mannheim: Special Commendation of The Jury, 1958Blood and Fire (1958)
 Ohio State Radio and TV Awards, Columbus, Ohio: First Prize, 1960
11th Canadian Film Awards, Toronto: Award of Merit, TV Information, 1959The Back-Breaking Leaf (1959)
 1960 Cannes Film Festival, Cannes: Eurovision Grand Prize, Documentary Films, 1960
 American Film and Video Festival, New York: Blue Ribbon Award, Agriculture, Conservation and Natural Resources, 1961
 International Labour and Industrial Film Festival, Antwerp: Diploma of Merit, Films Dealing with the Problems of People at Work, 1963The Cars in Your Life (1960)
 American Film and Video Festival, New York: Blue Ribbon, Citizen, Government & City Planning, 1963Universe (1960)
14th British Academy Film Awards, London: BAFTA Award for Best Animated Film, 1961
 Yorkton Film Festival, Yorkton: Golden Sheaf Award, Best Film of the Festival, 1960
 Vancouver International Film Festival, Vancouver: First Prize, Documentary, 1960
 13th Canadian Film Awards, Toronto: Genie Award for Film of the Year, 1961
 13th Canadian Film Awards, Toronto: Genie Award for Best Theatrical Short, 1961
Salerno Film Festival, Salerno: First Prize – Documentary, 1961
 American Film and Video Festival, New York: Blue Ribbon, Science and Mathematics, 1961
 Columbus International Film & Animation Festival, Columbus, Ohio: Chris Award, Information/Education, 1961
 Rapallo International Film Festival, Rapallo: Cup of the Minister of Tourism and Entertainment, 1961
 Mar del Plata International Film Festival, Mar del Plata: Grand Prize, 1962
 International Festival of Educational Films, Mar del Plata: Best Documentary, 1962
 La Plata International Children’s Festival, La Plata: Silver Oak Leaf, First Prize, Scientific Films, 1962
 International Educational Film Festival, Tehran: Golden Delfan, First Prize, Scientific Films, 1964
 Cannes Film Festival, Cannes: Jury Prize for Exceptional Animation Quality, 1960
 Cannes Film Festival, Cannes: Technical Mention of the Commission Supérieure Technique du Cinéma Français, 1960
 International Festival of Scientific and Technical Films, Belgrade: Diploma of Honour, 1960
 International Festival of Short Films, Philadelphia: Award for Exceptional Merit, 1961
 Stratford Film Festival, Stratford, Ontario: Special Commendation, 1960
 Cork International Film Festival, Cork: First Prize – Diploma of Merit, 1960 
 Edinburgh International Film Festival, Edinburgh: Diploma of Merit, Science, 1960
 Vancouver International Film Festival, Vancouver: Diploma, Scientific Films, 1960
 Scientific Film Festival, Caracas: Award of Merit, 1963
 Scholastic Teacher Magazine Annual Film Awards, New York: Award of Merit, 1963
 Educational Film Library Association of America, New York: Nomination, 10 Best Films of the Decade List, 1968
 33rd Academy Awards, Los Angeles: Nominee: Best Documentary Short Subject, 1961The Days of Whiskey Gap (1961)
 1961 Cannes Film Festival, Cannes: Grand Prize, Documentary, 1961
 Canadian Historical Association, Toronto: Certificate of Merit "for outstanding contribution to local history in Canada", 1962
 Vancouver International Film Festival, Vancouver: Honorable Mention, Sociology, 1962Lonely Boy (1962)
 Festival dei Popoli, Florence, Italy: Gold Medal, 1960
 International Short Film Festival Oberhausen, Oberhausen: First Prize, Documentary, 1963
 15th Canadian Film Awards, Montreal: Film of the Year, 1963
 15th Canadian Film Awards, Montreal: Best Film, General Information, 1963
 Vancouver International Film Festival, Vancouver: First Prize, Documentary, 1962
 Ann Arbor Film Festival, Ann Arbor, Michigan: The Purchase Prize, 1963
International Days of Short Films, Tours, France: Special Jury Prize, 1962
 Edinburgh International Film Festival, Edinburgh, Scotland: Honorable Mention, 1962
 1962 Cannes Film Festival, Cannes: Honorable Mention, Documentary Works, 1962The Living Machine (1962)
 Columbus International Film & Animation Festival, Columbus, Ohio: Chris Award, Public Information, 1963
 Villeurbanne Short Film Festival, Villeurbanne: Diploma of Honor, 1963The Hutterites (1964)
 Montreal International Film Festival, Montreal: First Prize, Shorts, 1964
 Columbus International Film & Animation Festival, Columbus, Ohio: Chris Award, First Prize, Religion, 1964
 Yorkton Film Festival, Yorkton: Golden Sheaf Award, First Prize, Human Relations, 1964
 Melbourne Film Festival, Melbourne: Honorable Mention, 1964
 American Film and Video Festival, New York: Blue Ribbon, Doctrinal and Denominational Topics, 1965
 Landers Associates Awards, Los Angeles: Award of Merit
 Festival dei Popoli/International Film Festival on Social Documentary, Florence: Second Prize, 1965Above the Horizon (1964)
 Electronic, Nuclear and Teleradio Cinematographic Review, Rome: Best Film in the Scientific Category, 1970
 International Survey of Scientific and Didactic Films, Padua: First Prize, Didactic Films
 Australian and New Zealand Association for the Advancement of Science (ANZAAS), Sydney: Orbit Award, 1966
 18th Canadian Film Awards, Montreal: Best Film for Children, 1966
 International Scientific Film Festival, Lyon: Honorable Mention for Popularization of a Scientific Subject, 1969
 International Exhibition of Scientific Film, Buenos Aires: Diploma of Honor, 1966Nobody Waved Goodbye (1964) 
 18th British Academy Film Awards, London: BAFTA Award for Best Documentary, 1965
 Salerno Film Festival, Salerno: First Prize, 1968
 International Filmfestival Mannheim-Heidelberg, Mannheim: CIDALC Award, 1964
 International Film Festival at Addis Ababa, Addis Ababa: Third Prize, Feature Film, 1966
 Toronto International Film Festival, Toronto: 9th Place, Canada’s Ten-Best Films, 1984Legault’s Place (1964) 
 Melbourne Film Festival, Melbourne: Diploma of Merit, 1966
 Chicago International Film Festival, Chicago: Diploma of Merit, 1965Stravinsky (1965)
 Montreal International Film Festival, Montreal: Special Mention, Short Films, 1965Bargain Basement (1976)
 American Film and Video Festival, New York: Blue Ribbon, Fiction Films, 1977
 International Filmfestival Mannheim-Heidelberg, Mannheim: People’s College Diploma, 1976For Gentlemen Only (1976)
27th Canadian Film Awards, Toronto - Genie Award for Best TV Drama, 1976One Man (1977)
 ACTRA Awards, Montreal: Film of the Year, 1978
 Film Festival Antwerpen, Antwerp: Second Best Film of the Festival, 1978
 Film Festival Antwerpen, Antwerp: Honorable Mention by the Press Jury, 1978Henry Ford's America (1977) 
 International Emmy Awards, New York: Best Non-Fiction Television Film, 1977
 Golden Gate International Film Festival, San Francisco: Special Jury Award for Outstanding Achievement - Film as Communication, 1977
 Columbus International Film & Animation Festival, Columbus, Ohio: Chris Bronze Plaque, Social Studies, 1978
 HEMISFILM, San Antonio TX: Bronze Medallion for the Best Film, Documentary Over 27 Minutes, 1978
 American Film and Video Festival, New York: Red Ribbon, Features: History & Economics, 1978
 U.S. Industrial Film Festival, Elmhurst, Illinois: Silver Screen Award for Outstanding Creativity in the Production of Audio-Visual Communications in International Competition, 1978
 Chicago International Film Festival, Chicago: Certificate of Merit, 1977
 APGA Film Festival, Washington, DC: Honorable Mention, 1977Voice of the Fugitive (1978)
 Banff World Media Festival, Banff, Alberta: Second Prize, Non-Serialized Drama, 1979Teach Me to Dance (1978)
Child of our Time Festival, Milan: Diploma of Honor, 1979Revolution's Orphans (1979)
 Chicago International Film Festival, Chicago: Bronze Hugo, Short Subject - Drama, 1979Why Men Rape (1979) 
 American Film and Video Festival, New York: Red Ribbon, Mental Health, 1981Bravery in the Field (1979)
 1st Genie Awards, Toronto: Outstanding TV Drama Under 30 Minutes, 1980
52nd Academy Awards, Los Angeles: Nominee: Best Live Action Short Film, 1979Challenger: An Industrial Romance (1980)
 Grierson Awards, Toronto: Grierson Award for Outstanding Documentary, 1981
 Columbus International Film & Animation Festival, Columbus, Ohio: Chris Bronze Plaque, 1981
 Golden Gate International Film Festival, San Francisco: Silver Award for Second-Best Film of the Festival, 1980
 Golden Gate International Film Festival, San Francisco: Best in Category: Promotion, Commercial Sales and Public Relations, 1980
 Information Film Producers of America, Los Angeles: Gold Cindy Award, Best of Show, 1981
 U.S. Industrial Film Festival, Elmhurst, Illinois: First Place, Gold Camera Award, 1981
Bijou Awards, Toronto: Best Documentary, 1981
 Festival of Technical Films and Films on Industrial Design, Budapest: Special Prize, Informatory and Product-Propaganda Films, 1982
 American Film and Video Festival, New York: Honorable Mention, Management Training Films, 1982Nose and Tina (1980)
 Yorkton Film Festival, Yorkton: Golden Sheaf Award for Best Film, Human Condition, 1981
Bijou Awards, Toronto: Outstanding Documentary Under 30 Minutes, 1981

Footnotes

References

 Life After Darth'', Steve Silberman, Wired Magazine, May 2005

External links

Roman Kroitor's films at the National Film Board of Canada

1926 births
Canadian inventors
Film directors from Saskatchewan
Canadian documentary film directors
Canadian cinema pioneers
People from Yorkton
National Film Board of Canada people
Canadian documentary film producers
Canadian film production company founders
2012 deaths
University of Manitoba alumni
IMAX
Film producers from Saskatchewan